Syningen Nunatak is a nunatak 1 mile (1.6 km) south of See Nunatak in the eastern part of the Hansen Mountains. Mapped and named by Norwegian cartographers from air photos taken by the Lars Christensen Expedition, 1936–37.

Nunataks of Kemp Land